Sultanbekovo (Soltanbäk) is a rural locality (a village) and the administrative center of Sultanbekovsky Selsoviet, Askinsky District, Bashkortostan, Russia. The population was 459 as of 2010. There are 10 streets.

Geography 
Sultanbekovo is located 54 km east of Askino (the district's administrative centre) by road. Churashevo is the nearest rural locality.

References 

Rural localities in Askinsky District